The following is a list of albums released by defunct record label RSO Records.

1970s

1973 
Bee Gees - Life in a Tin Can
Blue - Blue
Eric Clapton - Eric Clapton's Rainbow Concert

1974 
Bee Gees - Mr. Natural
Jack Bruce - Out of the Storm
Eric Clapton - 461 Ocean Boulevard
Freddie King - Burglar
Love - Reel to Reel

1975 
Bee Gees - Main Course
Eric Clapton - E. C. Was Here
Eric Clapton - There's One in Every Crowd
Yvonne Elliman - Rising Sun
Freddie King - Larger Than Life
Revelation - Revelation
Various artists - Peter and the Wolf

1976 
Bee Gees - Bee Gees Gold
Bee Gees - Children of the World
Eric Clapton - No Reason to Cry
The Impressions - Loving Power
Freddie King - Freddie King (1934-1976)
Lady Flash - Beauties in the Night

1977 
Bee Gees - Here at Last... Bee Gees... Live
Gene Clark - Two Sides to Every Story
Eric Clapton - Slowhand
Rick Dees & His Cast of Idiots - The Original Disco Duck
Barbara Dickson - Morning Comes Quickly
Yvonne Elliman - Love Me
Andy Gibb - Flowing Rivers
Paul Nicholas - Paul Nicholas
Player - Player
John Stewart - Fire in the Wind
Various artists - Saturday Night Fever

1978 
Bee Gees - 20 Greatest Hits
Jim Capaldi - Daughter of the Night
Eric Clapton - Backless
Yvonne Elliman - Night Flight
Andy Gibb - Shadow Dancing
Player - Danger Zone
Various artists - Grease: The Original Soundtrack from the Motion Picture
Various artists - Sgt. Pepper's Lonely Hearts Club Band

1979 
AKB - Rhythmic Feet
Bee Gees - Bee Gees Greatest
Bee Gees - Spirits Having Flown
Jim Capaldi - Electric Nights
Linda Clifford - Here's My Love
Linda Clifford - Let Me Be Your Woman
East Coast - East Coast
Yvonne Elliman - Yvonne
Festival - Evita
Gavin Christopher - Gavin Christopher
The Headboys - The Headboys
Highway - Highway 1
Leroy Hutson - Unforgettable
Alvin Lee - Ride On
Curtis Mayfield - Heartbeat (Curtis Mayfield album) (Curtom)
Mistress - Mistress
Suzi Quatro - Suzi ... and Other Four Letter Words
John Stewart - Bombs Away Dream Babies
Various artists - The Original Soundtrack From The Motion Picture Meatballs
Various artists - Moment by Moment: The Original Soundtrack from the Motion Picture

1980s

1980 
Ron Carter - Empire Jazz
Linda Clifford - I'm Yours
Linda Clifford and Curtis Mayfield - The Right Combination (Curtom)
Eric Clapton - Just One Night
Andy Gibb - After Dark
Andy Gibb - Andy Gibb's Greatest Hits
The Kingbees - The Kingbees
Curtis Mayfield - Something to Believe In (Curtom)
Meco - Christmas in the Stars: Star Wars Christmas Album
Johnny Rivers - Borrowed Time
The Rockets - No Ballads
Jimmy Ruffin - Sunrise
John Stewart - Dream Babies Go Hollywood
Various artists - Star Wars: The Empire Strikes Back (Original Motion Picture Soundtrack)
Various artists - Fame: The Original Soundtrack from the Motion Picture
Various artists - Times Square: The Original Motion Picture Soundtrack

1981 
Bee Gees - Living Eyes (Bee Gees album)
Eric Clapton - Another Ticket
The Kingbees - The Big Rock
Shot in the Dark - Shot in the Dark

1982 
Eric Clapton - Timepieces: The Best of Eric Clapton
Various artists - Grease 2: Original Soundtrack Recording

1983 
Various artists - Star Wars: Return of the Jedi (Original Motion Picture Soundtrack)
Various artists - Staying Alive: Original Motion Picture Soundtrack

References 

Discographies of American record labels